The following is a list of writers who have worked on the Fox animated television series The Simpsons in the order of first credited episode (by broadcast). As of March 19, 2023, 152 people have been credited with writing or co-writing at least one episode of The Simpsons.

List of writers

Timeline of producers and show runners

References

Simpsons Archive

Simpsons
Writers
Articles which contain graphical timelines